The Huastec civilization (sometimes spelled Huaxtec or Wastek) was a pre-Columbian civilization of Mesoamerica, occupying a territory on the Gulf coast of Mexico that included the northern portion of Veracruz state, and neighbouring regions of the states of Hidalgo, Querétaro, San Luis Potosí, and Tamaulipas. The Huastec people were an early offshoot of the Maya peoples that migrated northwards.

Surviving remains from the Huastec civilization include several large archaeological sites, a well-preserved temple, and a large amount of stone sculpture. By the Late Postclassic (c. AD 1200–1521), the Huastecs had developed metallurgy and were producing copper alloys. The Aztec Empire conquered the Huastec region around the 15th century, and probably demanded tribute payments.

Culture
The Huastec civilization is poorly studied, although there is a large body of stone sculpture, and a well-preserved Late Postclassic temple at Castillo de Teayo. In the Late Postclassic, the Huastec region was a centre for metallurgy that included the production of copper alloys. The Huastec region was conquered by the Aztecs, probably in the 15th century, and it is likely that the Huastecs paid tribute to the Aztec Empire.

Notable Huastec archaeological sites include Vista Hermosa, with 120 platform mounds, Platanito with 150 platform mounds, and Tamtok, a large Late Postclassic site. The Huastecs were not politically unified, and were organised into a number of competing city-states.

Origins
The Huastec are an isolated offshoot of the Maya. Although the Huastec language is a Mayan language, the Huastec civilization is not considered to be a part of the Maya civilization.  They did not employ the Maya writing system, and there are no known pre-Spanish Conquest Huastec documents. Generally, the Huastecs are considered to have split from the main branch of the Maya around 2000 BC, in the Preclassic period, with this early separation accounting for the differences between Huastec and Maya culture. Several studies have argued a more recent split from the mainstream Maya in the Postclassic, based on archaeological and linguistic evidence. In the latter case, it is proposed that the Huastec migrated from the central Maya region as a result of the Classic Maya collapse (c. 830–950 AD).

Religion
The Huastecs placed an emphasis on worshiping Ehecatl, the Mesoamerican god of wind. The Huastecs built characteristically circular pyramids in his honor, some of which still comprise a distinguishing aspect of many Huastec ruins today. When the Huastecs were subjugated by the Aztec Empire, Aztec religious leadership recognized the sacred status of Ehecatl in Huastec society and thus added the wind deity to their own pantheon.

See also 

 El Sabinito 
 Balcon de Montezuma
 Las Flores
 Tamuin

Notes

References

 (2000). "The Precolumbian Cultures of the Gulf Coast" In Richard E.W. Adams and Murdo J. Macleod (eds.). The Cambridge History of the Native Peoples of the Americas, Vol. II: Mesoamerica, part 1. Cambridge, UK and New York, US: Cambridge University Press. pp. 156–196. . 
 (2002). Handbook to Life in the Ancient Maya World Oxford, UK and New York, US: Oxford University Press. . 
;  (28 August 1992) "The Huastec Region: A Second Locus for the Production of Bronze Alloys in Ancient Mesoamerica". Science. New Series (American Association for the Advancement of Science) 257 (5074):1215–1220. . .  
 (1996). The Art of Mesoamerica London, UK: Thames and Hudson. . 
 (2010). Identity Politics: Huastec Sculpture and the Postclassic International Style and Symbol Set Ann Arbor, Michigan, US: ProQuest.  
 (May–June 2006) Los huastecos. Arqueología Mexicana. (in Spanish) Mexico City, Mexico: Editorial Raíces.

Further reading

;  (2003) J.P. Laporte, B. Arroyo, H. Escobedo and H. Mejía eds. "El problema del Wasteko: Una perspectiva lingüística y arqueológica". Simposio de Investigaciones Arqueológicas en Guatemala (in Spanish) (Guatemala City, Guatemala: Museo Nacional de Arqueología y Etnología) XVI (2002): 714–724
 (2005) Alan R. Sandstrom and E. Hugo García Valencia eds. "The Huastec Maya" Native Peoples of the Gulf Coast of Mexico Tucson, Arizona, US: University of Arizona Press. pp. 255–282  

Mesoamerican cultures
History of Veracruz
History of Querétaro
History of Hidalgo (state)
History of Mexico
History of Tamaulipas